The Oscar Peterson Trio Plays is a 1964 album by Oscar Peterson.

Reception

Writing for AllMusic, critic Ken Dryden stated: "While it isn't one of Oscar Peterson's very best releases, it is well deserving of being reissued on CD in America."

Track listing
 "The Strut" (Oscar Peterson) – 4:05
 "Let's Fall in Love" (Harold Arlen, Ted Koehler) – 4:41
 "Satin Doll" (Duke Ellington, Johnny Mercer, Billy Strayhorn) – 5:19
 "Little Right Foot" (Traditional) – 4:53
 "Fly Me to the Moon" (Bart Howard) – 4:17
 "Lil' Darlin'" (Neal Hefti) – 3:09
 "This Nearly Was Mine" (Oscar Hammerstein II, Richard Rodgers) – 4:15
 "Shiny Stockings" (Frank Foster) – 4:05
 "You Stepped Out of a Dream" (Nacio Herb Brown, Gus Kahn) – 3:05

Personnel

Performance
Oscar Peterson – piano
Ray Brown – double bass
Ed Thigpen – drums

References

1964 albums
Oscar Peterson albums
Albums produced by Norman Granz
Verve Records albums